Cardrona Alpine Resort is an alpine resort in New Zealand's South Island. The ski field ranges from 1,260m to 1,860m. The distribution of slopes is 25% beginner, 25% intermediate, 30% advanced and 20% expert. There are 2 detachable quad chairlifts, 2 fixed-grip quad chairlifts, 1 detachable express chondola, 3 surface conveyor learner lifts and 1 platter lift to service the halfpipes and big air jump. Snowmaking supplements the 2.9m average annual snowfall. Freestyle Snowboarding and skiing are well catered for with 2 half pipes and 4 terrain parks. There is also a "high performance centre" which trains more advanced skiers and snowboarders. Families with infants and young children can use child care facilities provided in the Cardrona Nursery and Ski Kindy.

The resort is located near Wānaka, 5.5 hours drive from Christchurch, 3 hours drive from Dunedin and 50 minutes drive from Queenstown. On-mountain accommodation is provided in the form of 15 self-contained apartments.

There was a tradition, that at the bottom of the mountain, women leave their old bra on the Cardrona Bra Fence before leaving town.

Cardrona Alpine Resort was founded by Cardrona Valley locals John and Mary Lee. It opened for its first winter in 1980. There was so much snow in the first winter that the mountain was only able to open for 3 weeks, around many days of clearing the resort road with a bulldozer. John Lee was not a skier, so built Cardrona's base area in the middle of the resort at 1670m – something very rare for a ski field.

The resort was bought by the Vealls of Melbourne in 1989. This was also the year Cardrona built New Zealand's first international halfpipe.

The old Captain's chairlift (replaced by the Captain's Express) was reinstalled, as the Valley View Quad, below the existing Whitestar Express before the 2010 winter. The main purpose of this lift was to allow construction of a competition grade downhill run, by increasing the lifted vertical available to the resort.  General trails are available though.  Due to insufficient snow cover this lift did not open for the 2010 season.  Stage 2 of the plan was set for the 2011 winter and added snowmaking.  The lift has opened every winter from 2011 onwards.

In 2013, New Zealand company Real Journeys purchased Cardrona Alpine Resort.  Along with Real Journeys, Cardrona became part of the privately-owned Wayfare Group, subsequently rebranded as RealNZ.

In December 2019, the Commerce Commission gave approval for Cardrona to purchase Treble Cone Investments Ltd. In early 2020, Cardrona reported that they were working towards merging the operations and marketing of the two resorts.

Lifts
In 2016, the McDougall's Quad Chairlift was removed and replaced with a new high speed "Chondala" lift with both 8 person gondolas and 6 person chairs, improving summer operations at the resort.  In 2019 they announced that the old McDougall's quad would be installed below the captain's basin of the ski field. However, this was cancelled, as native lizards were found in the area and would have been disturbed by the development. As of 2021 the lift was relocated to the Soho Ski Area and named Willow's Quad, after the cult classic film Willow, that was filmed in the area in the 1980's. The lift opens up 65 hectares of new, skiable terrain and will be open for the 2021 winter season.

References

External links

 Cardrona Alpine Resort website
 OnTheSnow.com snow report for Cardrona
 Powderhounds.com reviews of Cardrona
 New Zealand ski Cardrona page

Ski areas and resorts in Otago